The 1998 Open Championship was a men's major golf championship and the 127th Open Championship, held from 16–19 July at the Royal Birkdale Golf Club in Southport, England. In weekend wind and rain, Mark O'Meara won his second major championship of the year and first Open Championship in a playoff over Brian Watts, the 54-hole leader.

Three months earlier, O'Meara won the Masters on the final green by sinking a  birdie putt. At age 41, he became the oldest player to win two majors in a year: Jack Nicklaus (1980), Ben Hogan (1953), and Craig Wood (1941) were all age forty. (Hogan won three majors and turned 41 two weeks after the third.)

At the previous Open at Royal Birkdale seven years earlier in 1991, O'Meara was a co-leader after 54 holes, shot 69, and tied for

Course

Source:
Lengths of the course for previous Opens:

 1991: , par 70
 1983: , par 71  
 1976: , par 72
 1971: , par 73

 1965: , par 73
 1961:    
 1954:

Past champions in the field

Made the cut

Source:

Missed the cut

Source:

Round summaries

First round
Thursday, 16 July 1998

Source:

Second round
Friday, 17 July 1998

Source:
Amateurs: Rose (-2), García (+4), De Vooght (+6), McCarthy (+8), Kuchar (+10).

Third round
Saturday, 18 July 1998

Source:

Final round
Sunday, 19 July 1998

Sources:
Amateurs: Rose (+2), García (+12), De Vooght (+19).

Playoff
The four-hole aggregate playoff was played on the concluding holes (15–18).O'Meara birdied the first, while Watts parred, and they halved the next two holes with pars.Watts bogeyed the final hole, while O'Meara parred to win the playoff by two strokes and the Claret Jug.

Four-hole aggregate playoff on holes 15–18

Scorecard

Cumulative playoff scores, relative to par

Source:

References

External links
Royal Birkdale 1998 (Official site)
127th Open Championship - Royal Birkdale (European Tour)

The Open Championship
Golf tournaments in England
Open Championship
Open Championship
Open Championship